Wavell may refer to:

People
 Archibald Wavell, 1st Earl Wavell (1883–1950), British field marshal
 Archibald Wavell, 2nd Earl Wavell (1916–1953), British soldier
 Stewart Wavell (1921–2010), British-Malaysian writer

Places
 Wavell Heights, Queensland, Australia

Buildings
 The Wavell School, Farnborough, England
 Wavell State High School, Wavell Heights, Queensland, Australia

English-language surnames